Shadab Khan (Urdu, Punjabi: شاداب خان) is a Pakistani international cricketer who plays for and  vice-captains the Pakistan cricket team in limited overs cricket. He captains Pakistan Super League (PSL) franchise Islamabad United, and Northern in domestic cricket. An all-rounder, Khan is Pakistan's most successful T20I bowler. He is also regarded as one of the best fielders in Pakistan. As of 2022, he has been among the players centrally contracted by the Pakistan Cricket Board (PCB).

Personal life
On 23 January 2023 he married Pakistani cricket coach and former international player Saqlain Mushtaq's daughter Malaika Saqlain in a private nikah ceremony.

Career
On 18 December 2020, Khan captained the Pakistan team for the first time in an international match, when he led the side in the first Twenty20 International (T20I) against New Zealand during Babar's injury. On 26 August 2016, he made his Twenty20 debut for Rawalpindi in the 2016–17 National T20 Cup. After his impressive performance in the 2017 ICC Champions Trophy, he was signed to play for Trinbago Knight Riders in the 2017 Caribbean Premier League. Later in 2017, Shadab signed with the Brisbane Heat for the 7th season of the Big Bash League.

In June 2019, Khan was selected to play for the Edmonton Royals franchise team in the 2019 Global T20 Canada tournament. In December 2021, he was named the captain of Islamabad United following the players' draft for the 2021 Pakistan Super League. He made his Twenty20 International (T20I) debut for Pakistan against the West Indies on 26 March 2017. He recorded the most economical figures for a bowler completing their four overs on debut in a T20I. The following month, he was added to Pakistan's Test squad for their series against the West Indies.

Khan made his One Day International (ODI) debut for Pakistan against the West Indies on 7 April 2017. He made his Test debut for Pakistan, also against the West Indies, on 30 April 2017. He was part of Pakistan's 2017 Champions Trophy winning squad. In September 2017, he was named the PCB's Emerging Player of the Year.

On 16 October 2017, against Sri Lanka, Khan scored his maiden ODI fifty. Khan, along with Babar Azam, made a partnership of 109 and slowly built the innings towards 200. When bowling, Khan took early breakthroughs in the low-scoring game taking three wickets. Pakistan won the match by 32 runs and Shadab was adjudged the man of the match for his all-round performances.

In April 2019, Khan was named to Pakistan's squad for the 2019 Cricket World Cup. Three days after Khan was named in Pakistan's World Cup squad, he was ruled out of Pakistan's preceding tour of England with a virus. He was replaced by Yasir Shah for the matches against England. Ahead of the third ODI match against England, Pakistan's captain, Sarfaraz Ahmed, confirmed that Shadab had recovered and would be fit enough to play at the World Cup. On 23 June 2019, in Pakistan's World Cup match against South Africa, Shadab took his 50th wicket in ODIs.

In June 2020, Khan was named in a 29-man squad for Pakistan's tour to England during the COVID-19 pandemic. However, on 22 June 2020, Shadab was one of three players from Pakistan's squad to test positive for COVID-19. Although he had shown no previous symptoms of the virus, he was advised to go into a period of self-isolation. In July, he was shortlisted for Pakistan's 20-man squad for the Test matches against England. On 28 August 2020, in the first T20I match against England, Shadab took his 50th wicket in the format.

In September 2021, Khan was named the vice-captain of Pakistan's squad for the 2021 ICC Men's T20 World Cup.

References

External links

 
 

1998 births
Living people
Pakistani cricketers
Pakistan Test cricketers
Pakistan One Day International cricketers
Pakistan Twenty20 International cricketers
Cricketers from Mianwali
Cricketers at the 2019 Cricket World Cup
Brisbane Heat cricketers
Guyana Amazon Warriors cricketers
Islamabad cricketers
Islamabad United cricketers
Khulna Tigers cricketers
Khyber Pakhtunkhwa cricketers
Rawalpindi cricketers
Trinbago Knight Riders cricketers